Kangerluaraq, old spelling Kangerdluaraq, is a fjord in the King Frederick VI Coast, Kujalleq municipality, southern Greenland.

Geography
Kangerluaraq is a narrow fjord lying between the Kuutseq to the north and the Nattoralik and Nanuuseq fjords to the south. 
It extends in a roughly east–west direction from its mouth in the North Atlantic Ocean for about 24 km until its head. Its entrance is on the northern side of Cape Walløe (Kangersivasik). 

In the same manner as in the fjords further north, dark-hued mountains rise steeply from the shore on both sides. However, there are no glaciers reaching down to the waterline in Kangerluaraq, the fjord ending in a steep and narrow valley at its western end.

See also
List of fjords of Greenland

References

External links
Den grønlandske Lods - Sejladsanvisninger Østgrønland
 Ketilidian structure and the rapakivi suite between Lindenow Fjord and Kap Farvel, South-East Greenland
The Ketilidian orogen of South Greenland: geochronology, tectonics, magmatism, and fore-arc accretion during Palaeoproterozoic oblique convergence

Fjords of Greenland